The following is a list of Major League Baseball players, retired or active.

Ph through Py

References

External links
Last Names starting with P – Baseball-Reference.com

 Ph-Pz